Anghel Crețeanu (5 April 1910 – 7 January 1987) was a Romanian footballer who played as a goalkeeper.

International career
Anghel Crețeanu played six games at international level for Romania, including four matches at the 1934–35 and 1935 Balkan Cup.

Honours
Unirea Tricolor București
Divizia A: 1940–41
Divizia B: 1938–39
Cupa României runner-up: 1940–41

Notes

References

External links
Anghel Crețeanu at Labtof.ro

1910 births
1987 deaths
Romanian footballers
Romania international footballers
Association football goalkeepers
Liga I players
Liga II players
FC Petrolul Ploiești players
Sportspeople from Galați